Richmond Hill is a federal electoral district in Ontario, Canada, that has been represented in the House of Commons of Canada since 2004.

It was created in 2003 from parts of Oak Ridges riding.

Geography
The riding includes the neighbourhoods of Elgin Mills, Bayview North, Bayview South, North Richvale, Hillsview, Bayview Hill, South Richvale, Langstaff and Doncrest in the City of Richmond Hill.

The electoral district consists of the part of Richmond Hill lying south of a line starting at the intersection of Bathurst Street and Elgin Mills Road West, east along Elgin Mills to Bayview, south along Bayview to the unnamed creek north of Taylor Mills Drive North, along the creek to Shirley Drive, Shirley Drive south to Major Mackenzie Drive, and east on Major Mackenzie to the eastern city limits. It also contains the part of the City of Markham east of Bayview Avenue, north of Highway 407, and west of Highway 404.

Demographics

''According to the Canada 2021 Census; 2013 representation

Languages: 32.8% English, 13.2% Yue, 11.6% Mandarin, 10.4% Iranian Persian, 4.1% Russian, 2.6% Italian, 2.5% Korean, 1.8% Persian, 1.2% Arabic, 1.2% Tagalog, 1.2% Spanish
Religions: 39.5% Christian (18.1% Catholic, 4.8% Christian Orthodox, 1.4% Anglican, 1.3% United Church, 1.1% Baptist, 1% Presbyterian), 37.6% No religion, 12.7% Muslim, 4.4% Jewish, 2.3% Buddhist, 2.3% Hindu 
Median income (2020): $35,600 
Average income (2020): $55,000

Ethnicity groups: Chinese: 32.6%, White: 32.4%, West Asian: 13.9%, South Asian: 6.8%, Korean: 3.4%, Black: 2.4%, Filipino: 2.4%, Arab: 1.3%, Latin American: 1.3%

Ethnic origins: Chinese 28.7%, Iranian 10.8%, Italian 6.4%, English 4.4%, Canadian 4.3%, Indian 4.1%, Russian 4.0%, Persian 4.0%, Irish 3.8%, Scottish 3.4%

Member of Parliament

This riding has elected the following member of the House of Commons of Canada:

Election results

See also
 List of Canadian federal electoral districts
 Past Canadian electoral districts

References

Riding history from the Library of Parliament
 Campaign expense data from Elections Canada

Notes

Ontario federal electoral districts
Politics of Richmond Hill, Ontario
2003 establishments in Ontario